Winston Thomas, better known by his stage name BlackOut or DJ BlackOut, founder & CEO of BlackOut Movement, is an American record producer, engineer and composer. Blackout is signed to Nicki Minaj's recording company Pink Friday Records. Blackout is also co-founder of the music tech startup company, RecordGram.

Life and career
BlackOut was born "Winston Thomas" in Freeport, NY. His father is from Kingston, Jamaica, while his mother is from Mandeville, Jamaica. He got his start working high school parties and local clubs in the New York area. It was in the club that he got his first break and met Wyclef Jean. Blackout joined the Refugee Camp as a deejay for the artist, Reptile, and got his first taste of touring in the music industry. During his time with the Refugee Camp, Blackout began dabbling in production and made it his hobby. It wasn't long before he became a staple in the deejay industry and began playing gigs nationwide. He eventually became linked with Jada Kiss and toured with him for three years. While playing a gig in a South Beach club, D.J. Blackout slipped a CD of beats to hip hop artist, Ja Rule. This chance meeting would mark the beginning of Blackout's career as a music producer. One of BlackOut's beats was selected to be on Ja Rule's Blood In My Eye Album. Soon after, BlackOut started his own production company Blackout Movement. Full steam ahead, BlackOut and his new company catapulted to the top of the game 1 year later when the company produced the debut album from hip-hop artist Mims, including the widely popular single “This Is Why I'm Hot”. Blackout Movement has since worked with some of the leading artists in the industry. In 2012, Blackout signed to Nicki Minaj's, Pink Friday record label. BlackOut is also co-founder of RecordGram, a music tech startup. RecordGram is 1 of 7 music tech companies to be accepted into Project Music, the music tech accelerator program in Nashville.

Production style
BlackOut produces various genres of music. Hip Hop, Pop, R&B, Reggae, and Dance Music. BlackOut states "being a DJ, I am exposed to a lot of music, all the time. That keeps me up to date" BlackOut chiefly produces  with Akai MPC4000 and Pro Tools, and just recently been using Native Instruments' MASCHINE and LOGIC to create as he travels.

Production discography

Singles

Awards and nominations

References

External links
 Official website

Year of birth missing (living people)
Living people
People from Freeport, New York
American hip hop record producers
Nicki Minaj
Record producers from New York (state)
Mixing engineers